Ocean's Eleven is a 2001 American heist comedy film directed by Steven Soderbergh from a screenplay by Ted Griffin. The first installment in the Ocean's film trilogy, it is a remake of the 1960 Rat Pack film of the same name. The film features an ensemble cast including George Clooney, Matt Damon, Andy García, Brad Pitt, Julia Roberts, Casey Affleck, Scott Caan, Elliott Gould, Bernie Mac, Qin Shaobo, and Carl Reiner. The story follows friends Danny Ocean (Clooney) and Rusty Ryan (Pitt), who plan a heist of $160million from casino owner Terry Benedict (García), the lover of Ocean's ex-wife Tess (Roberts).

Ocean's Eleven was theatrically released in the United States on December7, 2001, by Warner Bros. Pictures. The film received positive reviews from critics and was a box-office hit, grossing $450.7million worldwide and becoming the fifth-highest-grossing film of 2001. Soderbergh directed two sequels, Ocean's Twelve in 2004 and Ocean's Thirteen in 2007. Ocean's 8, a spin-off with an all-female lead cast, was released in 2018.

Plot 
Following his release from prison, Danny Ocean violates his parole (in which he is to stay in New Jersey) by traveling to Los Angeles to meet his friend and partner in crime Rusty Ryan to propose a heist. The two go to Las Vegas to pitch the plan to wealthy friend and former casino owner Reuben Tishkoff. 

The plan consists of simultaneously robbing the Bellagio, the Mirage, and the MGM Grand casinos. Reuben's familiarity with casino security makes him very reluctant to get involved, but when he starts to think of it as a good way to get back at his rival, Terry Benedict, who owns all three casinos, he agrees to finance the operation. 

The three men know that the Nevada Gaming Commission requires casinos to have enough cash on hand to cover all their patrons' bets and they predict that on the night of a highly anticipated boxing match, the Bellagio vault will contain more than $150million.

Danny and Rusty recruit eight former colleagues and criminal specialists: con men Frank Catton and Saul Bloom, auto specialists Virgil and Turk Malloy, explosives expert Basher Tarr, electronic surveillance technician Livingston Dell, acrobat "The Amazing" Yen, and pickpocket Linus Caldwell. Several team members carry out reconnaissance at the Bellagio to learn as much as possible about the security, the routines, the behaviors of the casino staff, and the building itself. Other members create a precise replica of the vault, which is built in order to practice maneuvering through its formidable security systems. 

During this planning phase, the team discovers that Danny's ex-wife, Tess, is Benedict's girlfriend. Rusty urges Danny to give up on the plan, believing Danny incapable of sound judgment while Tess is involved, but Danny refuses.

On the night of the fight, the plan is put into motion. Danny shows up at the Bellagio purposely to be seen by Benedict, who, as predicted, locks him in a storeroom with Bruiser, a bouncer. However, Bruiser is on Danny's payroll and allows him to access the vent system and join his team as they seize the vault, coincident with activities of their other team members in and around the casino. 

Rusty calls Benedict on a cell phone Danny dropped in Tess's coat earlier and tells him that unless he lets them have half of the money in the vault, they will blow it up; Benedict sees video footage confirming Rusty's claim. Benedict complies, having his bodyguards take the loaded duffel bags to a waiting van driven by remote control. Benedict has his men follow the van while he calls in a SWAT team to try to secure the vault. 

The SWAT team's arrival causes a shootout that sets off the explosives and incinerates the remaining cash. After affirming the premises otherwise secure, the SWAT team collects their gear and departs.

As Benedict arrives to examine the ruined vault himself, his men stop the van and find the bags were only loaded with flyers for prostitutes. Benedict studies the video footage and realizes that the flooring in the vault on the video lacks the Bellagio logo, which had been added only recently to the vault. It is shown that Danny's team used their practice vault to create fake footage to fool Benedict. Furthermore, they themselves were the SWAT team and used their gear bags to take all of the money from the vault right under Benedict's nose. 

Benedict goes to see that Danny has seemingly been locked up in the storeroom throughout the heist and thus innocent of any involvement. As Tess watches via closed-circuit television, Danny tricks Benedict into saying he would give her up in exchange for the money. Benedict, dissatisfied with Danny's plan to get back the money, orders his men to escort Danny off the premises and inform the police that he is violating his parole by being in Las Vegas. 

Tess leaves Benedict and exits the hotel just in time to see Danny arrested. The rest of the team bask in the victory in front of the Fountains of Bellagio, silently going their separate ways one by one.

When Danny is released after serving time for his parole violation, he is met by Rusty and Tess. They drive off, closely followed by Benedict's bodyguards, whose presence was noted by Rusty as he and Danny approach Rusty's car.

Cast

The Eleven
In order of recruitment:

 George Clooney as Danny Ocean, an ex-con who establishes a heist
 Bernie Mac as Frank Catton, a discredited croupier and con man
 Brad Pitt as Robert "Rusty" Ryan, Danny's friend and partner in crime
 Elliott Gould as Reuben Tishkoff, a former casino owner who is Danny's wealthy friend
 Casey Affleck as Virgil Malloy, a gifted mechanic
 Scott Caan as Turk Malloy, a gifted mechanic and Virgil's brother
 Eddie Jemison as Livingston Dell, an electronics and surveillance expert
 Don Cheadle as Basher Tarr, an explosives expert
 Qin Shaobo as "The Amazing" Yen, an acrobat
 Carl Reiner as Saul Bloom, an elderly con man
 Matt Damon as Linus Caldwell, a pickpocket who aids Danny

Others
 Andy García as Terry Benedict, the owner of three casinos who is Reuben's rival
 Julia Roberts as Tess Ocean, Danny's ex-wife and Terry's girlfriend
 Scott L. Schwartz as Bruiser, a huge bruiser working with Ocean

Cameos
 Five television actors make cameos as themselves, being taught how to play poker by Rusty:
 Holly Marie Combs
 Topher Grace
 Joshua Jackson
 Barry Watson
 Shane West
 Jerry Weintraub as Denny Shields, a high-roller gambler
 Siegfried & Roy as themselves
 Wayne Newton as himself
 Henry Silva and Angie Dickinson as themselves (both appeared in the original film)
 Eydie Gormé and her husband Steve Lawrence as themselves
 Boxers Wladimir Klitschko and Lennox Lewis as themselves
 Boxing commentator Larry Merchant and sportscaster James Lampley as themselves
 Steven Soderbergh as one of the bank robbers with Basher

Production
In 1987, David Permut, who had produced a film adaptation of the 1950s TV show Dragnet, declared his intention to remake the 1960 film, but the project never materialized. In January 2000, Warner Bros. was reported to be moving forward with Steven Soderbergh on development of an Ocean's Eleven remake, starring George Clooney, Brad Pitt, and Julia Roberts. Johnny Depp was being considered for Linus Caldwell, while Luke and Owen Wilson were in discussions to play the Malloy twins. The Wilson brothers had to decline due to their commitment to The Royal Tenenbaums. Mike Myers, Bruce Willis, Ewan McGregor, Alan Arkin, and Ralph Fiennes were considered for roles but also ended up dropping out. Filmmakers Joel and Ethan Coen were considered as replacements for the Wilson brothers, but Soderbergh cast Caan and Affleck instead. Mark Wahlberg was originally cast as Caldwell, but left in favor of starring in another remake, Planet of the Apes, and was subsequently replaced with Damon. Clooney's commitment to Ocean's Eleven forced him to turn down the lead role in Unfaithful.

Ocean's Eleven was filmed between February11 and June7, 2001, primarily in Las Vegas but with some scenes shot in New Jersey, Chicago, Los Angeles, Florida, and Burbank. As producer Jerry Weintraub was friends with the Bellagio's owner, Kirk Kerkorian, the production team was granted permission to film there. The "pinch" used in the film to black out power in Las Vegas was based on the real-life Sandia Z-pinch. However, the effect shown is unrealistic, as no device of the size shown could achieve that effect.

Music 
 "Cha Cha Cha" written by James D'Angelo, Leo Johns, Jimmy Kelleher, Marc Lanjean, Henri Salvador and Marcel Stellman; performed by Jimmy Luxury and The Tommy Rome Orchestra
 "The Projects" (P Jays) written by Dan Nakamura, Paul Huston, Tarin Jones and Trugoy The Dove (as David Jolicoeur); performed by Handsome Boy Modeling School" featuring De La Soul (as Trugoy (De La Soul)) and Del (as Del Tha Funkee Homosapien)
 "Papa Loves Mambo" written by Al Hoffman, Dick Manning and Bickley Reichner; performed by Perry Como
 "Take My Breath Away" written by Giorgio Moroder and Tom Whitlock; performed by Berlin
 "Spirit in the Sky" written and performed by Norman Greenbaum
 "Blues in the Night" written by Harold Arlen and Johnny Mercer; performed by Quincy Jones
 "Caravan" written by Duke Ellington and Juan Tizol; performed by Arthur Lyman
 "A Little Less Conversation" written by Billy Strange and Mac Davis; performed by Elvis Presley
 "Gritty Shaker" written and performed by David Holmes
 "Spanish Flea" written by Julius Wechter; performed by Powerpack Orchestra
 "Misty" composed by Erroll Garner; performed by Liberace
 "Dream, Dream, Dream" written by Jimmy McHugh, Jean Pierre Mottier, Mitchell Parish and Jeannine Melle; performed by Percy Faith and His Orchestra
 "Moon River" written by Henry Mancini and Johnny Mercer; performed by Liberace
 "Theme From A Summer Place" written by Max Steiner
 "Theme For Young Lovers" written and performed by Percy Faith and His Orchestra
 "69 Police" written by David Holmes, Phil Mossman, Darren Morris, Aldo Tagliapietra, Stanley Walden and Giovanni Smeraldi; performed by David Holmes (remix of the Le Orme song Ad Gloriam)
 "Clair de Lune" written by Claude Debussy and arranged by Lucien Cailliet; performed by The Philadelphia Orchestra; conducted by Eugene Ormandy

Reception

Critical response
The site's critical consensus reads, "As fast-paced, witty, and entertaining as it is star-studded and coolly stylish, Ocean's Eleven offers a well-seasoned serving of popcorn entertainment." On Metacritic the film has a weighted average score of 74 out of 100, based on 35 critics, indicating "generally favorable reviews". Audiences polled by CinemaScore gave the film an average grade of "B+" on an A+ to F scale.

People magazine called the film "pure fun from start to finish," and included it in its end-of-year Best of Screen list. Newsweek said Ocean's Eleven "bounces along with finger-snapping high spirits," and said that while Soderbergh has "made deeper films, ...this carefree caper movie is nothing to sneeze at." Time magazine's reviewer Richard Corliss criticized the film, saying it "doesn't offer much." In a poll during November 2008, Empire magazine called Ocean's Eleven the 500th best film on The 500 Greatest Movies of All Time. For Don Cheadle's role in this film, he needed to learn to speak with a cockney accent, which drew harsh reviews from critics and is recognized as being one of the worst accents in film. Cheadle commented on his accent, saying "My British friends ... tell me [it's] a truly terrible London accent in Ocean's Thirteen. You know something, I really worked on that accent. Went to London, spoke to people, got to know it... my agent said it was fine, so I'm stuck with this thing. Even though everyone laughs at me. So I sacked her, of course".

Entertainment Weekly put "The Ocean's Eleven heist scene" on its end-of-the-decade, "best-of" list, saying, "Featuring three impregnable Vegas casinos and 11 ring-a-ding criminals, Steven Soderbergh's 2001 roll of the dice provided the most winning robbery sequence of the decade."

Box office
Ocean's Eleven had a budget of about $85 million. On its opening weekend, it grossed an estimate of $38.1 million and was the top box-office draw for the weekend, dethroning Harry Potter and the Sorcerer's Stone. The film surpassed What Women Want to have the highest December opening weekend. That record was very brief, as it was quickly surpassed by The Lord of the Rings: The Fellowship of the Ring two weeks later. Moreover, Ocean's Eleven had the largest opening weekend for both a Brad Pitt film and a Julia Roberts film, beating Interview with the Vampire and Runaway Bride simultaneously. It also had the third-highest opening weekend for any film starring George Clooney, behind Batman & Robin and The Perfect Storm. The film grossed $183,418,150 in the United States, $267,311,379 overseas, totaling $450,728,529 worldwide.

Home media 
Ocean's Eleven  was released on VHS and DVD on May 7, 2002.

Sequels 
Soderbergh directed two sequels, Ocean's Twelve in 2004 and Ocean's Thirteen in 2007, which make up the Ocean's Trilogy.

A new Ocean's film with an all-female cast led by Sandra Bullock, titled Ocean's 8, was released June 8, 2018. It was conceived by producer Jerry Weintraub, Soderbergh and Clooney. Olivia Milch and Gary Ross were writer of the screenplay, and director respectively. Cate Blanchett, Helena Bonham Carter, Anne Hathaway, Sarah Paulson, Rihanna, Mindy Kaling and Awkwafina made up the ensemble cast.

Other adaptations 
Takarazuka Revue adapted the movie as a musical in 2011–2012 in Japan (Takarazuka Grand Theater; Tokyo Takarazuka Theater). The production was performed by Star Troupe and the cast included Reon Yuzuki as Danny Ocean, Nene Yumesaki as Tess Ocean and Shio Suzumi as Rusty Ryan.

The 2014 Bollywood film Happy New Year draws heavily on the plot of Ocean's Eleven, with Shah Rukh Khan starring as the protagonist.

See also
 List of films set in Las Vegas

References

External links

 
 
 
 Ocean's Eleven at The Numbers
 
 
 

2001 comedy films
2000s American films
2000s crime comedy films
2000s English-language films
2000s heist films
American crime comedy films
American films about gambling
American heist films
Comedy film remakes
Crime film remakes
Fictional portrayals of the Las Vegas Metropolitan Police Department
Films about con artists
Films based on works by George Clayton Johnson
Films directed by Steven Soderbergh
Films scored by David Holmes (musician)
Films set in California
Films set in the Las Vegas Valley
Films set in New Jersey
Films shot in Atlantic City, New Jersey
Films shot in California
Films shot in the Las Vegas Valley
Films with screenplays by Ted Griffin
Eleven
Remakes of American films
Village Roadshow Pictures films
Warner Bros. films